The Light River is a river of Fiordland, New Zealand. It rises west of Lake Quill and flows westward into Te Hāpua / Sutherland Sound.

See also
List of rivers of New Zealand

References

Rivers of Fiordland